Theodor Arnold (1683–1771) was a German Anglicist from Leipzig, at the time a part of the Electorate of Saxony. He was a professor at the University of Leipzig and published numerous English grammars, dictionaries, and translations for German and Danish readers. His works were among the most popular for English-language learning in Germany in the 18th and 19th centuries.

Bibliography

 New English Grammar (Hanover: 1718 & Leipzig: 1823 & 1829)
 Grammatica Anglicana Concentrata, oder Kurtz-gefaßte Englische Grammatica (Leipzig: 1736 & 1781) 
 The Quran (from George Sale's English translation, 1746) 
 A Compleat English Dictionary oder Vollständiges Englisch-Deutsche Wörter-Buch (Leipzig: 1752) 
 A Complet Vocabulary, English and German (Leipzig: 1757 & 1790) 
 Vollständiges Deutsch-Englishes Wörterbuch (Leipzig: 1778 & 1783) 
 Grammatica Anglicana et Danica Concentrata eller Engelske og Danske Grammatika (Copenhagen: 1791) 
 Engelske Grammatik (Copenhagen: 1800) 
 Fuldstændig Engelsk og Dansk Haand-Ordbog (Copenhagen: 1820)

Citations

References

 .
 .
 .
 .
 .
 .
 
 .
 .
 .
 .
 .

1683 births
1771 deaths